Lamashegu is a community (formerly in the Tamale Metropolitan District) currently in the Tamale South Municipality in the Northern Region of Ghana.

See also
Suburbs of Tamale (Ghana) metropolis

References 

Communities in Ghana
Suburbs of Tamale, Ghana